Caersws railway station is a railway station on the Cambrian Line in mid-Wales, serving the village of Caersws.

History
The notable Welsh romantic poet John Ceiriog Hughes was employed as a station master and Manager of the Van Railway at Caersws railway station from 1868 until his death in 1887.

From 1871 to 1940 the Van Railway terminated at Caersws. The station was built by the Newtown and Machynlleth Railway of the Cambrian Railways in the 1890s. Originally there was a passing loop, a goods shed, a water tower and a ticket office and a signal box - the latter remained in use until March 2011 as a gate box to supervise the station level crossing (this is now operated from Machynlleth).

The station was threatened with closure in 1964 along with all of the other wayside stops on the former Cambrian main line (as a consequence of the Beeching cuts), but reprieved by the Minister of Transport Tom Fraser in December that year to act as the notional railhead for the town of Llanidloes (following the demise of the Mid-Wales Railway that served it directly).

In February 2013, Caersws station won the "Wales’ Best Unstaffed Train Station" award, supported by Keep Wales Tidy.

Facilities
Though unstaffed, the station has a ticket machine installed. Train running information is offered via CIS displays, automated announcements, timetable poster boards and a customer help point. There is also payphone available. Step-free access is available from the entrance to the platform.

Services
There is a basic two-hourly service in each direction Mon-Sat, with some additional services in the morning and evening (most of which run between Shrewsbury and  only).

Gallery

References

Sources

External links 

Railway stations in Powys
DfT Category F1 stations
Former Cambrian Railway stations
Railway stations in Great Britain opened in 1863
Railway stations served by Transport for Wales Rail
Grade II listed buildings in Powys
Grade II listed railway stations in Wales